The King of Kings is a 1963 Czechoslovak comedy film directed by Martin Frič.

Plot summary

Cast
 Jiří Sovák as Lojza Králu - mounter
 Miloš Kopecký as Izmail el Sarif ben Serfi
 Vlastimil Brodský as Eda Brabec
 Jiřina Bohdalová as Coiffeuse Lenka
 Walter Taub as Assassin Poupard
 Jiří Němeček as Company director
 Ilja Prachar as Novák - Officer of Ministry of Foreign Affairs
 Zdeněk Řehoř as Pantucek - Officer of Ministry of Foreign Affairs
 Eduard Kohout as Deputy minister
 Jan Skopeček as Chamberlain
 Ota Motycka as Janitor in factory
 Lubomír Kostelka as Teacher of language
 Zdenek Braunschläger as Constructor
 Josef Bartunek as Guard
 Jitka Frantová as Prostitute

References

External links
 

1963 films
1963 comedy films
1960s Czech-language films
Czechoslovak black-and-white films
Films directed by Martin Frič
Czech comedy films
1960s Czech films